Multipotentiality is an educational and psychological term referring to the ability and preference of a person, particularly one of strong intellectual or artistic curiosity, to excel in two or more different fields.

It can also refer to an individual whose interests span multiple fields or areas, rather than being strong in just one. Such traits are called multipotentialities, while "multipotentialites" has been suggested as a name for those with this trait.

By contrast, those whose interests lie mostly within a single field are called "specialists."

History

Etymology
An early instance of the term in the record comes from relevant research in giftedness.

In 1972, R.H. Frederickson et al. defined a multipotentialed person as someone who, “when provided with appropriate environments, can select and develop a number of competencies to a high level.”

In 1999, "multipotentiality" appears in Laurie Diane Shute's doctoral dissertation which was titled "An investigation of multipotentiality among university honors students."

On October 22, 2008, Douglas Hannay began a blog that lasted some eight years. His first blog referred to multipotentializing as excelling in multiple fields of energy. The blog was then copied in its entirety to Facebook on September 22, 2016, after viewing Emilie Wapnick’s TED talk on being a multipotentialite during October 2015.

In 2010, multipotentiality appeared again in Tamara Fisher's article in Education Week. She defines it thus:

During 2015, Emilie Wapnick coined the term "multipotentialite", perhaps to establish a shared identity for the community. She defines it this way:

Relevant terminology

While the term "multipotentialite" is often used interchangeably with polymath or Renaissance Person, the terms are not identical. One need not be an expert in any particular field to be a multipotentialite.

Indeed, Isis Jade makes a clear distinction between multipotentiality and polymaths. Multipotentiality refers simply to one's potential in multiple fields owing to his/her diverse interests and attempts. Polymaths, on the other hand, are distinguished by their mastery and expertise in several fields. In this sense, multipotentialites can be viewed as potential polymaths.

Other terms used to refer to multipotentialites are "scanners", "slashers", "generalist", "multipassionate", "RP2", and "multipods", among others.

Context
With the advent of the industrial age, cultural norms have shifted in favor of specialization. Indeed, in the modern day, the more narrow the specialization, the higher the pay and respect accorded, for example: PhD graduates, and specialized lawyers, doctors, and engineers. The aphorism Jack of all trades, master of none emphasizes this. Older emphasis towards generalism and multiple potentials such as Renaissance humanism and the Renaissance man were replaced.

However, the convergence economy, Internet age, connectivity, the rise of the Creative Class, and other modern developments are bringing about a return of a more positive opinion for generalists and multipotentialites.

In Specialization, Polymaths And The Pareto Principle In A Convergence Economy, Jake Chapman writes:

Business
Organizations such as startups that require adaptability and holding multiple roles can employ several multipotentialites and have one specialist as a resource.

In Specialization, Polymaths And The Pareto Principle In A Convergence Economy, Chapman said:

Stretch Magazine discusses the role of multipotentialites in organizations and how they will believe they will be more in demand in the future.

Criticism of specialization
Historical context, current conventional wisdom, comparative advantage, USP, among others contribute to the wide acceptance of specialization.

Proponents of specialization above cite excellence and its perceived higher rewards compared to mediocrity in everything. Proponents of multiple capabilities below emphasize the importance of adaptability.

In "Master of Many Trades", Robert Twigger goes so far as to coin the word "monopath": "It means a person with a narrow mind, a one-track brain, a bore, a super-specialist, an expert with no other interests — in other words, the role-model of choice in the Western world."

This sentiment is not new. In Time Enough for Love (1973), Robert A. Heinlein wrote:

In an article on the decline of polymathy, Felipe Fernández-Armesto wrote, "Universities bear some responsibility for its extinction. Classical Greece, Renaissance Italy and Victorian England all revered and rewarded generalists, for whom today universities have little or no space or patience. Enclosed departments in discrete spaces, with their own journals and jargons, are a legacy of lamentable, out-of-date ways of organising knowledge and work."

Lives of multipotentialites

Advantages
Advantages available to these people who have developed skills in multiple fields:

 rapid learning and fast skill acquisition (learn how to learn)
 idea synthesis
 adaptability
 translating between modes of thought
 concocting new solutions
 contextual thinking
 enthusiasm
 novelty and variety
 fit well into leadership roles
 empathize with a broader set of people and cultures

According to Tim Ferriss, a renowned generalist:

Disadvantages
 lose out on the benefits of specialization, ultra long-term commitment
 distraction and burn out
 depending on person, mastery or competence can take longer to achieve. While there is some dispute as to the degree of prevalence of this phenomenon, it can be a significant problem for those who experience it, leading to overscheduling, high stress levels, confusion, paralysis by analysis, and impulsive or conformist choices in gifted children, and to feelings of social alienation, purposelessness, apathy and depression in the brightest of adults.

Boredom is also a frequent occurrence in multipotentialites who have already "mastered" or learned everything they desire to know about a particular topic before moving on. 

They will also encounter opposition from career counselors, parents and friends who wish for them to choose conventional specialized career paths.

Impact
In a world that overvalues specialization, the term and its increasing popularity (especially among the blogging community) have contributed to the revival of awareness on the importance of generalists. The concept was even mentioned in a Jamaican newspaper as the subject of a competition's training session.

In the current economy, Creativity and the rise of the Creative Class are linked to divergent thinking and innovative solutions to current problems. Because new ideas can be found in the intersection of multiple fields, they would benefit from the advantages of multipotentialites.

See also
 Polymath
 Renaissance humanism
 Jack of all trades
 Generalist (disambiguation)
 Speed learning
 Creative Class
 Creativity

Notes

Further reading 
 Araki, M. E. (2015). Polymathic Leadership: Theoretical Foundation and Construct Development (Master's thesis). Retrieved 29 January 2018.
 Burns, Peter, "What makes a Renaissance Man?".
 
 Edmonds, David (August 2017). Does the world need polymaths?, BBC.
 Frost, Martin, "Polymath: A Renaissance Man".
 Grafton, A, "The World of the Polyhistors: Humanism and Encyclopedism", Central European History, 18: 31–47. (1985).
 Jaumann, Herbert, "Was ist ein Polyhistor? Gehversuche auf einem verlassenen Terrain", Studia Leibnitiana, 22: 76–89. (1990) .
 Mirchandani, Vinnie, "The New Polymath: Profiles in Compound-Technology Innovations", John Wiley & Sons. (2010).
 
 Twigger, Robert, "Anyone can be a Polymath" .
 
 Waquet, F, (ed.) "Mapping the World of Learning: The 'Polyhistor' of Daniel Georg  Morhof" (2000).
 Wiens, Kyle, "In defense of polymaths".

Educational psychology
Giftedness